Halie Tiplady-Hurring (born 27 February 1986) is a female rugby union player. She represents  and Otago. She was a member of the 2010 Women's Rugby World Cup winning squad  and has been named in the 2014 Women's Rugby World Cup squad to France.

References

External links
Black Ferns Profile

1976 births
Living people
New Zealand women's international rugby union players
New Zealand female rugby union players
Rugby union wings
Rugby union fullbacks
Canterbury rugby union players
Otago rugby union players